The 1942 Idaho gubernatorial election was held on November 3. Republican nominee and former governor C. A. Bottolfsen defeated Democratic incumbent Chase Clark with 50.15% of the vote.

This was a rematch of the 1940 election, with different results.

Primary elections

Primary elections were held on August 11, 1942.

Democratic primary

Candidate
Chase Clark, Idaho Falls, incumbent governor (unopposed)

Republican primary

Candidates
C. A. Bottolfsen, Arco, former governor
W. H. Detweiler, Hazelton, state legislator
Thomas McDougall, Boise attorney

General election

Candidates
C. A. Bottolfsen, Republican 
Chase Clark, Democratic

Results

References

1942
Idaho
Gubernatorial